Klown may refer to:
 The 2010 Danish comedy film Klown

An accidental or stylish misspelling of clown, a comedic performer
Krusty the Klown, a character from TV series The Simpsons
Klowning, a form of spiritual 'evolution' promoted by Kenja, an Australian cult
Klown (creature), alien clowns featured in the films Killer Klowns from Outer Space and Return of the Killer Klowns from Outer Space in 3D
Klown Kamp Massacre, a 2010 film in which a serial murderer begins killing his fellow camp members.